Paul Michael Moss (born 2 August 1957) is an English former professional footballer who played as a midfielder in the Football League.

References

Sources
 

1957 births
Living people
Footballers from Birmingham, West Midlands
English footballers
Association football forwards
Wolverhampton Wanderers F.C. players
Hull City A.F.C. players
Scunthorpe United F.C. players
Worcester City F.C. players
English Football League players